Jan Meerhout (before 1630, Gorinchem – 1677, Amsterdam), was a Dutch Golden Age painter.

Biography
According to the RKD his birth date is uncertain, but he married in 1650. He worked in Utrecht, Heusden and Dordrecht as well as Amsterdam and Gorinchem and is known for cityscapes.

References

Jan Meerhout and a view of Schelluinen, on "Golden Age Gorinchem Foundation" website
Jan Meerhout on Artnet

1630 births
1677 deaths
Dutch Golden Age painters
Dutch male painters
People from Gorinchem